Joseph Gemayel (born 10 November 1944) is a Lebanese fencer. He competed in the individual and team épée events at the 1964 Summer Olympics.

References

External links
 

1944 births
Living people
Lebanese male épée fencers
Olympic fencers of Lebanon
Fencers at the 1964 Summer Olympics